The Bear Cage is a 1974 Belgian drama film directed by Marian Handwerker. It was entered into the 1974 Cannes Film Festival.

Cast
 Jean Pascal as Léopold Thiry
 Yvette Merlin as La mère
 Michel François as Bernard
 Puce as Julie
 Pascal Bruno as Grand-père
 Daniel Dury as Lucien
 Jacques Courtois as Prof. de français
 Marcel Melebeck as Frère du père
 Tine Briac as Femme du frère
 Jules Goffaux as Le colonel
 Patrick Boelen as Dumont

References

External links

1974 films
1970s French-language films
1974 drama films
Belgian drama films